Rechamballi is a village in Chamarajanagar district of Karnataka state, India. It is located between Chamarajanagar town and Yelandur town.

Demographics
Rachamballi has an area of 287 hectares and a population of 619,634. The nearest town is Yelandur about 10 km away.

Nearby villages

 Suthur
 Chatipura
 Kallipura
 Masanapura
 H Mookahalli
 Homma
 Kotamballi
 Nanjarajapura
 Honganoor
 Bettahalli
 Gangavadi
 Hosapura
 Thimmegowdanapalya
 Hanumanapura
 Melmala
16.
Gowdahalli

See also
 Kagalvadi
 Yelandur
 Chamarajanagar
 Irasavadi

References

Villages in Chamarajanagar district